Oliver Burchett Clarence (25 March 1870, Hampstead, London – 2 October 1955, Hove, Sussex) was an English actor.

Following his education at Dover College and University College Hospital, he made his stage debut in 1890. His experience included Shakespearean and other repertory with Frank Benson and Ben Greet. He performed in more than eighty productions in London, originating roles in plays by W. S. Gilbert, Bernard Shaw and others. He toured the provinces, appeared several times on Broadway, and made many films between 1914 and 1948.

Life and career

Early years
Clarence was born on 25 March 1870 in Hampstead, London, the son of Lovell Burchett Clarence (1838–1917), a colonial Supreme Court judge, and his wife Blanche, née Gunter (1840–1886). He was intended for a medical career, and after his schooling at Dover College he studied at University College Hospital, London, before abandoning medicine for the stage. He made his first appearance on the stage at the old Trocadero Music Hall on 14 July 1890, with Arthur Lloyd and first appeared on what he called "the regular stage" at the Olympic Theatre, in December 1890, in The People's Idol. For four years he was a member of F. R. Benson's company, playing numerous parts. He then toured with Miss Fortescue, Muriel Wylford. and in Africa with Leonard Rayne, before returning to Britain and touring with Ben Greet as the Rev Gavin Dishart in The Little Minister. He rejoined Benson, appearing at the Lyceum (1900) and the Comedy (1901).

In May 1901 he appeared at the Royal Opera House, Covent Garden, as Verges in Charles Villiers Stanford's operatic version of Much Ado About Nothing. The following year he joined Herbert Beerbohm Tree's company at His Majesty's, playing Simple in The Merry Wives of Windsor, Starveling and Quince in A Midsummer Night's Dream and Adam in As You Like It. After engagements on tour and in the West End he joined the Garrick Theatre company, under Arthur Bourchier, in February 1904, and appeared there in roles ranging from the Rev Aloysius Parfitt and Harlequin in The Fairy's Dilemma to Old Gobbo in The Merchant of Venice. With the exception of Clown in The Winter's Tale in 1906 his roles in the 1900s were in modern plays, including The Voysey Inheritance and Our Miss Gibbs.

In late 1908 Clarence went to the US with Maxine Elliott, and played in Deborah of Tod's and The Inferior Sex. After a round of T. W. Robertson in London, he returned to the US in The Inferior Sex, subsequently touring with Olga Nethersole, playing Cayley Drummle in The Second Mrs Tanqueray, and M. Duval in Camille.

West End and Broadway
Clarence reappeared in London, at the Savoy in June 1911, playing Lord Feenix in Dombey and Son, and subsequently Jingle in Two Peeps at Pickwick. In the same year he married Hilda Bessie Forscutt; they had one daughter. In 1912 his parts included a rare title role: Kipps in a dramatisation of H. G. Wells's novel. Between then and 1919 he appeared in London and the provinces in mostly modern plays, and in January 1920 he returned to the US, playing in three plays in Broadway for the rest of that year and into 1921.

At the Everyman in May 1922 he played William in Bernard Shaw's You Never Can Tell, subsequently playing the same part in Zurich and Geneva, and in 1924 he played one of the roles most closely identified with him: the Inquisitor in Shaw's Saint Joan. The Times said of his performance:

The following year he played Firs in Nigel Playfair's production of The Cherry Orchard at the Lyric Theatre, Hammersmith. For the rest of the 1920s he appeared mostly in new West End plays ("most of which are now forgotten" according to The Times) though he played Lord Sands and Cranmer in Henry VIII in Lewis Casson's 1925 production, starring Sybil Thorndike, and Lord Ogleby in The Clandestine Marriage in 1928.

The rest of Clarence's long career followed a similar pattern: playing old men in ephemeral new plays in the West End and on Broadway, with occasional appearances in the classics, both old and new. These included a second run as the Inquisitor in Saint Joan (1931), Mazzini Dunn in Heartbreak House (1932), George Booth in The Voysey Inheritance (1934) and Sir William Gower in Trelawny of the 'Wells' (1938). In 1939 Clarence played Polonius in Tyrone Guthrie's modern-dress and uncut Hamlet with Alec Guinness in the title role.  He played Firs again in 1941 in a production by Guthrie at the New Theatre, and Old Hardcastle in She Stoops to Conquer in 1943 and 1945.

Clarence retired from the stage in 1945 and made the last of his many film appearances in 1948. He died in Hove, Sussex, on 2 October 1955, at the age of 85.

Reputation
The Times commented that Clarence had been "for more than half a century one of the most accomplished character actors on the English stage":

Films
Although best known as a stage actor, Clarence made many films between 1914 and 1948. They include:

 Liberty Hall (1914) – Todman Crafer
 London Pride (1920) – Mr. Tunks
 The Little Hour of Peter Wells (1920) – Peter Wells
 The Man from Chicago (1930) – John Larwood
 The Bells (1931) – Watchman
 Keepers of Youth (1931) – Slade
 Goodnight, Vienna (1932) – Theatre Manager
 Jack's the Boy (1932) – Timkins (uncredited)
 The Flag Lieutenant (1932) – Gen. Gough-Bogle
 Where Is This Lady? (1932) – Dr. Peffer
 The Barton Mystery (1932) – Sir Everard Marshall
 Discord (1933) – Mr. Hemming
 Perfect Understanding (1933) – Dr. Graham
 Soldiers of the King (1933) – Tom
 Excess Baggage (1933) – Lord Grebe
 Falling for You (1933) – Trubshawe
 His Grace Gives Notice (1933) – Lord Rannock
 A Shot in the Dark (1933) – Rev. John Makehan
 I Adore You (1933) – Mr. Young
 Friday the Thirteenth (1933) – Clerk
 Turkey Time (1933) – Shopkeeper (uncredited)
 The Silver Spoon (1933) – Parker
 Eyes of Fate (1933) – Mr. Oliver
 The Double Event (1934) – Rev. Martingale
 The Only Girl (1933) – Etienne
 The Great Defender (1934) – Mr. Hammond
 Song at Eventide (1934) – Registrar
 Nell Gwynn (1934) – Clockmaker (uncredited)
 Father and Son (1934) – Tom Yates
 Lady in Danger (1934) – Nelson
 The Scarlet Pimpernel (1934) – Count de Tournay
 The King of Paris (1934) – Mayor
 The Feathered Serpent (1934) – George Beale
 D'Ye Ken John Peel? (1935) – Ogleby
 Barnacle Bill (1935) – Uncle George
 Dandy Dick (1935) – Council Member (uncredited)
 Squibs (1935) – Sir John Barratt
 The Private Secretary (1935) – Thomas Marsland
 No Monkey Business (1935) – Professor
 Captain Bill (1935) – Sir Anthony Kipps
 The Cardinal (1936) – Monterosa
 Seven Sinners (1936) – Registrar
 East Meets West (1936) – Osmin
 All In (1936) – Hemingway
 The Mill on the Floss (1936) – Mr. Gore
 King of Hearts (1936) – Mr. Ponsonby
 Silver Blaze (1937) – Estate Agent (uncredited)
 Victoria the Great (1937) – Coachman-in-Chief
 Murder at the Baskervilles (1937) – De Marre
 Dinner at the Ritz (1937) – Messenger (uncredited)
 Second Best Bed (1938) – Torceston Magistrate (uncredited)
 Pygmalion (1938) – Mr. Birchwood – the Vicar
 It's in the Air (1938) – Sir Philip's Gardener (uncredited)
 Old Iron (1938) – Gordon
 A Spot of Bother (1938) – Butler (uncredited)
 Stolen Life (1939) – (uncredited)
 Me and My Pal (1939) – Judge
 Black Eyes (1939) – Waiter
 Jamaica Inn (1939) – Coach Passenger (uncredited)
 The Missing People (1939)
 Young Man's Fancy (1939) – Guest at Reception (uncredited)
 The Dark Eyes of London (1939) – Prof. John Dearborn (voice, uncredited)
 Return to Yesterday (1940) – Mr. Truscott
 Spy for a Day (1940) – Medical Officer
 Saloon Bar (1940) – Sir Archibald
 Major Barbara (1941) – Pettigrew
 Old Mother Riley in Business (1941)
 Quiet Wedding (1941) – First Magistrate
 Inspector Hornleigh Goes To It (1941) – Professor Mackenzie
 Turned Out Nice Again (1941) – Mr. Dawson
 Dangerous Moonlight (1941, released as Suicide Squadron in the USA) – Waiter with Tray of Wine
 Old Mother Riley's Circus (1941) – Lawyer
 Penn of Pennsylvania (1942) – Lord Cecil
 Gert and Daisy's Weekend (1942) – Vicar (uncredited)
 Front Line Kids (1942) – 'Real' Clergyman (uncredited)
 On Approval (1944) – Dr. Graham
 A Place of One's Own (1945) – Perkins
 The Way to the Stars (1945) – Minor Role (scenes deleted)
 Great Day (1945)
 Caesar and Cleopatra (1945) – Egyptian (uncredited)
 The Magic Bow (1946) – Old Gentleman
 School for Secrets (1946) – Old Retainer
 Great Expectations (1946) – The Aged Parent
 While the Sun Shines (1947) – Old Gentleman
 Meet Me at Dawn (1947) – Ambassador
 Uncle Silas (1947) – Vicar Clay
 The Calendar (1948) – Old Gentleman at Epsom
 No Room at the Inn (1948) – Reporter in Council Chambers (uncredited) (final film role)

References

Sources

External links

1870 births
1955 deaths
English male film actors
English male stage actors
People educated at Dover College
Male actors from London
Male actors from Kent
20th-century English male actors